McConnell Lake Provincial Park is a provincial park in British Columbia, Canada, located near Lac Le Jeune between Kamloops and Merritt, near BC Highway 5.

References
BC Parks webpage

Provincial parks of British Columbia
Nicola Country
Thompson Country
Year of establishment missing